Emirates International School is a private school located in the Meadows area of Emirates Hills, Dubai, UAE. In proximity to Dubai Marina and Lakes, EIS-Meadows was established in on 10 September 2005.

For the 2013/2014 school years, enrollment was cited by the KHDA to be 1,606 students, boys and girls represented from across 80 nationalities, from the ages of 3-19. Total number of teachers: 152.

Emirates International School Meadows follows the International Baccalaureate (IB). curriculum, offering Primary Years Programme  (PYP); IB Middle Years Programme; International General Certificate of Secondary Education  (IGCSE); and the IB Diploma Programme  in the post 16- phase.

Community activities include support for Dubai’s bid for Expo 2020.

This school is located Umm Suqeim, along Sheikh Zayed Road. It opened in 1991.

Emirates International School – Jumeirah offers as an International Baccalaureate curriculum to students in Kindergarten, Grades 1 through 13, ages 4–18. Total number of students enrolled 2013/2014: 1989.  Total number of full-time teachers: 197.
The school follows the National Curriculum of England, and the International Baccalaureate  (IB) curriculum at different stages. Children in the Kindergarten and students in Years 1 to 6 follow the IB Primary Years Programme (PYP); students in Years 7 to 11 followed the IB Middle Years Programme (MYP); Years 12 and 13 students engage in the IB Diploma Programme.
Along with Emirates International School Meadows, Emirates International School Jumeirah is one of the two privately owned schools under the Al Habtoor Group banner.

Notable alumni
 Dina Shihabi - Saudi actress

References

External links

 Emirates International School

International schools in Dubai
Private schools in the United Arab Emirates
Schools in Dubai
International Baccalaureate schools in the United Arab Emirates